BAYTL is a collaboration album between rappers Gucci Mane and V-Nasty, produced by Zaytoven and Tha Bizness. The album was released on December 13, 2011, through 1017 Brick Squad Records, Vice Records, Asylum Records and Warner Bros. Records.

The album's first official single was "Whip Appeal", which was released on November 19, 2011. On December 16, the rappers were preparing to shoot a music video for the song "Push Ups" at a recording studio in Atlanta. The song featured Slim Dunkin, who upon arrival got into an altercation with another rapper, Young Vito, which resulted in the fatal shooting of Slim Dunkin. On January 12, 2012, a video for the song "Let's Get Faded" was released and has so far been viewed over 2 million times.

Critical reception 

BAYTL was heavily panned by critics and listeners alike. According to Metacritic, scoring only 39/100. The album got a 2.5/5 rating from AllMusic, 2/5 from XXL, 1/10 from Spin and 0.5/5 from Consequence of Sound.

Track listing

Charts

References 

2011 albums
Gucci Mane albums
Albums produced by Zaytoven
Albums produced by Tha Bizness
Warner Records albums
Collaborative albums
Vice Records albums